Andrew Douglas Paley (born November 2, 1952) is an American songwriter, record producer, composer, and multi-instrumentalist who formed the Paley Brothers, a 1970s power pop duo, with his brother Jonathan Paley. Following their disbandment, Andy was a staff producer at Sire Records, producing albums for artists such as Brian Wilson, Jonathan Richman, NRBQ, John Wesley Harding, the Greenberry Woods, and Jerry Lee Lewis. He has also worked in film and television, composing scores and writing songs mostly for cartoons such as The Ren & Stimpy Show, Digimon, SpongeBob SquarePants, and Camp Lazlo.

Personal life and early career
Andy is the son of Henry Paley, a college administrator and lobbyist, and Cabot Barber Paley, a teacher and therapist.  He is the third of five children and grew up near Albany, New York.  His younger sister Sarah is married to former U.S. senator Bob Kerrey.  In 2010, he married Heather Crist in a ceremony officiated by Kerrey.

He began performing in his early teens as a drummer and singer for local Albany-area bands before moving to Boston. He was a founding member and the drummer of the Boston, Massachusetts band, Catfish Black, which also included future Modern Lovers members Jerry Harrison and Ernie Brooks. The band was renamed the Sidewinders and was later joined by Billy Squier.  The band performed around Boston and in NYC at venues like Max's Kansas City.  They released an album, produced by Lenny Kaye, which featured songs written and sung by Paley. The Sidewinders broke up in the mid-1970s.  Paley then played on Elliott Murphy's album Night Lights, and performed with Jonathan Richman after the break-up of the original Modern Lovers.

The Paley Brothers

Andy went on to form The Paley Brothers with his younger brother Jonathan, a guitar/bass player and singer who also was part of the early Boston punk scene and had played with Boston and NYC bands such as Mong. They disintegrated as an act in 1979 when Jonathan joined the Nervous Eaters. Although the Nervous Eaters collapsed after Ric Ocasek, who had produced their demo, was not permitted to produce their second album, the Paley Brothers did not reform. Said Jonathan, "It was more of an evolution.  Andy went on the road with Patti Smith's band and got into production work; I went and sailed around the world."

Collaborative work
In 1979, Andy Paley played guitar on Jonathan Richman's album Back in Your Life, and continued to perform on and off with Richman and later incarnations of the Modern Lovers, and produce many of their recordings, through the 1980s.  He produced Richman's 1985 album Rockin' and Romance.  Andy then focused on songwriting, session work and record production while working with Madonna, k.d. lang, Mandy Barnett, Jerry Lee Lewis, Elton John, Brenda Lee, Little Richard and many others.

Brian Wilson

In 1988, Paley produced and co-wrote songs on Wilson's solo comeback album Brian Wilson, and continued to work with him on unreleased material in the 1990s.  Wilson described Paley as a multi-instrumentalist with "a lot of talent for anything you can think of. ... He's the most frighteningly talented person that I've met, and the most serious about music."

Film and television work
He produced the soundtracks for Dick Tracy (1990) and A Walk on the Moon (1999) and wrote the original music for Traveller (1997, starring Bill Paxton). In 2009 he contributed to the soundtrack of World's Greatest Dad, directed by Bobcat Goldthwait and starring Robin Williams. He also wrote the musical score for Season One of Showtime's The L Word.

Paley also scored for cartoons such as The Ren & Stimpy Show, and later wrote and produced the music for Nickelodeon's SpongeBob SquarePants. He and Tom Kenny – the voice of SpongeBob – co-wrote the It's a SpongeBob Christmas! Album (2012). Paley and Kenny are also both members of Tom Kenny and the Hi-Seas. He leads the Andy Paley Orchestra, which provides the music for The Thrilling Adventure & Supernatural Suspense Hour, a theater group in Los Angeles that performs original stage productions in the style of old radio melodramas. Additionally he provides music for The Dana Gould Hour podcast.

Discography

Albums produced

References

External links

 

Living people
Record producers from New York (state)
The Modern Lovers members
Musicians from Albany, New York
Musicians from Washington, D.C.
Songwriters from New York (state)
Songwriters from Washington, D.C.
American male songwriters
American multi-instrumentalists
1952 births